The 2013–14 Tunisian Cup (Coupe de Tunisie) was the 82nd season of the football cup competition of Tunisia.
The competition was organized by the Fédération Tunisienne de Football (FTF) and open to all clubs in Tunisia.
The winner of Tunisian Cup qualifies to 2015 CAF Confederation Cup. But since Etoile du Sahel has already qualified for this competition after finishing in the 3rd position in Ligue 1, and CS Sfaxien having already qualified for the 2015 CAF Champions League after finishing 2nd, the qualification for the 2015 CAF Confederation Cup went to the club that finished 4th in Ligue 1, Club Africain.

Round of 32

Round of 16

Quarter-finals

Semi-finals

Final

See also
 2013–14 Tunisian Ligue Professionnelle 1
 2013–14 Tunisian Ligue Professionnelle 2

External links
 Coupe de Tunisie 2013-14

Tunisian Cup
Cup
Tunisia